Hertha Klust (1907 – March 1970) was a German pianist.

Career 
Born in Berlin, Klust, who had trained as a singer (mezzo-soprano), worked from 1949, despite increasing hearing loss, as a répétiteur at the Deutsche Oper Berlin, where she musically formed a number of later important singers, including Pilar Lorengar. In the concert hall, she made a name for herself above all as a song accompanist. Besides Ernst Haefliger and Josef Greindl, she accompanied the young Dietrich Fischer-Dieskau, which is documented by numerous radio and vinyl recordings of the 1950s. The joint concert activity with Fischer-Dieskau began as early as July 1948 in the Berlin  with a rendition of Schubert's Die schöne Müllerin and continued into the late 1950s.

In 1954 Klust was presented the Berliner Kunstpreis.

Discography 
Recordings with Dietrich Fischer-Dieskau:
 Johannes Brahms: Vier ernste Gesänge (1949) 
 Gustav Mahler: 3 Lieder from Des Knaben Wunderhorn (1952)
 Johannes Brahms: Die schöne Magelone (1953) 
 Franz Schubert: Die Winterreise (Konzertmitschnitt 1953)
 Robert Schumann: Liederkreis, op. 35 (Konzertmitschnitt 1954)
 Ludwig van Beethoven: Sechs Lieder von Gellert, op. 48 und 7 Lieder von Goethe (1955)
 Robert Schumann: Liederkreis, op. 24 and Der arme Peter op. 53,3 (1956)
 Hugo Wolf: Lieder from the Italienisches Liederbuch, aus den Goethe-Liedern, aus den Mörike-Liedern (1948 - 53)

Recording with Ernst Haefliger:
 Liederabend (Lieder by Schumann, Schoeck, Kodály and Wolf, 1958)

Recordings with Josef Greindl:
 Carl Loewe: Balladen (1951) 
 Franz Schubert: Die Winterreise (1957)

Further reading 
 Dietrich Fischer-Dieskau: Nachklang. Ansichten und Erinnerungen. Stuttgart 1987, 
 Österreichische Musikzeitschrift, vol. 25, issue 3 (March 1970): IN MEMORIAM: Gottfried Kassowitz, Hertha Klust on Walther de Gruyer website.

References

External links 
 
 

1907 births
1970 deaths
Musicians from Berlin
German classical pianists
Women classical pianists